Leeds East is a constituency represented in the House of Commons of the UK Parliament since 2015 by Richard Burgon of the Labour Party.

The constituency was represented by Denis Healey from 1955 to 1992. Healey served as Chancellor of the Exchequer from 1974 to 1979 and latterly as Deputy Leader of the Labour Party.

Constituency profile
This seat includes the areas of Leeds around York Road and Temple Newsam, including several large council estates. The seat is ethnically mixed and residents are poorer than the UK average.

Boundaries

1885–1918: The Municipal Borough of Leeds ward of East, and parts of the wards of Central, North, and North East.

1955–1974: The former County Borough of Leeds wards of Burmantofts, Crossgates, Halton, Harehills, and Osmondthorpe.

1974–1983: The County Borough of Leeds wards of Gipton, Halton, Osmondthorpe, Seacroft, and Whinmoor.

1983–2010: The City of Leeds wards of Burmantofts, Halton, Harehills, and Seacroft.

2010–present: The City of Leeds wards of Cross Gates and Whinmoor, Gipton and Harehills, Killingbeck and Seacroft, and Temple Newsam.

History
The constituency was created in 1885 by the Redistribution of Seats Act 1885, and was first used in the general election of that year.  Leeds had previously been represented by two MPs (1832–1868) and three MPs (1868–1885). From 1885 it was represented by five single-member constituencies: Leeds Central, Leeds East, Leeds North, Leeds South and Leeds West.  The constituencies of Morley, Otley and Pudsey were also created in 1885.

The constituency was abolished in 1918. After the 1918 general election, Leeds was represented by Leeds Central, Leeds North, Leeds North-East (created 1918), Leeds South, Leeds South-East (created 1918), and Leeds West.

The constituency was recreated in 1955.  After the 1955 general election Leeds was represented by Leeds East (created 1885, abolished 1918, recreated 1955), Leeds North East, Leeds North West (created 1950), Leeds South and Leeds South East. There were also constituencies of Batley and Morley (created 1918) and Pudsey and Otley (created 1918, replacing Pudsey).

Labour's Denis Healey held the seat for 37 years (1955–1992) and was Chancellor of the Exchequer during part of this time.

Members of Parliament

MPs 1885–1918

MPs 1955–present

Elections

Elections in the 2010s

Elections in the 2000s

Elections in the 1990s

Elections in the 1980s

Elections in the 1970s

Elections in the 1960s

Elections in the 1950s

Elections in the 1910s

Elections in the 1900s

Elections in the 1890s

Elections in the 1880s

See also
 List of parliamentary constituencies in West Yorkshire

Notes

References

Parliamentary constituencies in Yorkshire and the Humber
Constituencies of the Parliament of the United Kingdom established in 1885
Constituencies of the Parliament of the United Kingdom disestablished in 1918
Constituencies of the Parliament of the United Kingdom established in 1955
Politics of Leeds